Burnchurch Castle, a National Monument, is a well-preserved 15th century Norman tower house with a round gate tower, situated in the parish of Burnchurch, County Kilkenny, Ireland. Burnchurch Castle and tower, along with the Church of Ireland church, and the lime trees became a National Monument in 1993.

It is said to have been built and owned by the Fitzgeralds of the house of Desmond in 15th century and continued to be occupied until 1817. It is located in Burnchurch parish and was in the barony of Shillelogher.

Architecture
The 12.5m high circular turret still remains. A walled courtyard was originally attached to the castle. It is six storeys high, and has an unusually large number of passages and chambers inside the walls. A great hall was formerly attached to the tower's outside wall, but this has now vanished, as has most a bawn with a 41 foot tall tower at one corner. Old drawings, date unknown, show remnants of buildings.

Many tower houses have mural chambers and passages hidden away within their walls, though few have the number and complexity of those found in Burnchurch Castle. Beneath there is a vault with the principal chamber above, lying just below a gabled roof. There are numerous narrow rooms in the walls, including a "secret room" on the fourth floor.

A curved outside staircase still provides access to the three upper floors of this little tower so it can be explored. It has mullioned windows and is noteworthy for its finely carved fireplace with a joggled voussoir arch and its tall round chimney. The rounded chimney may be a later improvement.

It is broadly similar in size and layout to Clara Castle in Clara, but differs in that the gable-end walls are carried up one story higher than the other two walls and form to elongated turrets with their won rampart walls at the highest part of the building. Burnchurch Castle and Clara are good examples of the characteristic Irish-style of stepped battlements.

It is known for being one of several Irish towers with the slightly narrower sides of the castle extending up an additional floor, creating in essence a pair of tower wide turrets.

See also
 List of National Monuments in County Kilkenny

References

Further reading
.
.

External links

 Go Ireland - Burnchurch Castle
 Tourist Images and Tour of Irish Castles
 History - The Barrons, or Fitzgeralds, of Burnchurch
 Old Image - Edwin Rae Collection (Digital Image Collection), Image and more Images
 Burnchurch Castle made of Lego

Castles in County Kilkenny
National Monuments in County Kilkenny